The Australian Football League's 2006 finals series took place between the teams that finished in the top eight in the 2006 AFL season. It began on the weekend of 8 September 2006 and ended with the 110th AFL Grand Final at the Melbourne Cricket Ground on 30 September 2006.  The winner, West Coast Eagles, was crowned champion of the AFL after defeating Sydney by one point.

Eight teams qualified for the finals by finishing in the top eight of the premiership ladder.

With the top eight race effectively ending several rounds before the end of the season, the push for the final two positions in the top four heated up as all six teams below West Coast and Adelaide were vying for the crucial "double chance" with only a few rounds left. With wins in the final round, Fremantle and Sydney secured the "double chance" making it the first time in the game's history where the top four positions did not consist of a single Victorian team.

Ladder

Summary of results

The finals system 

The system is a final eight system. This system is different from the McIntyre final eight system, which was previously used by the AFL.

The top four teams in the eight receive what is popularly known as the "double chance", meaning that they cannot be eliminated from the finals in the first week match, the qualifying final. In contrast the bottom four of the eight play elimination finals in the first week, where only the winners move on to week two.

In the second week, the winners of the qualifying finals receive a bye (rest), while qualifying finals losers play the winners of the elimination finals. Home ground advantage goes to the team with the higher final 8 position.

In the third week, the winners of the semi-finals play the winners of the qualifying finals in the first week, with the latter receiving home-ground advantage. The winners of those matches move on to the Grand Final at the Melbourne Cricket Ground.

Week One
The first week of the finals series would have significantly been different had  not been successful in its appeal regarding the result of their controversially drawn match against  in round five of the premiership season. Had the draw stood, St Kilda would have finished third, Fremantle fourth, defending premiers Sydney fifth and Collingwood sixth. Thus, instead of the below fixture, the week one finals fixture would have been:

Qualifying finals
West Coast vs Fremantle at Subiaco Oval
Adelaide vs St Kilda at AAMI Stadium

Elimination finals
Sydney vs Western Bulldogs at Telstra Stadium
Collingwood vs Melbourne at MCG

Source

First Qualifying Final (West Coast vs. Sydney)

Second Qualifying Final (Adelaide vs. Fremantle)

First Elimination Final (Collingwood vs. Western Bulldogs)

Second Elimination Final (St Kilda vs. Melbourne)

Week Two

First Semi-final (West Coast vs. Western Bulldogs)

Second Semi-final (Fremantle vs. Melbourne)

Week Three

First Preliminary Final (Sydney vs. Fremantle)

Second Preliminary Final (Adelaide vs. West Coast)

Week Four

Grand Final (Sydney vs. West Coast)

Notes

References

Week One

 

 

<div style="font-size: 85%">

Week Two

Week Three

External links
 AFL official website
 RealFooty by The Age (Melbourne) Online 
 SportsAustralia (news and views)

AFL Finals Series
Finals Series